Maningrida Airport  is an airport serving Maningrida, Northern Territory, Australia. It is operated by Maningrida Council Inc.

Facilities

Airlines and destinations

See also
 List of airports in the Northern Territory

References

External links
 Maningrida Airport
 Image of airport
 

Airports in the Northern Territory